The acre is a unit of land area used in the imperial and US customary systems. It is traditionally defined as the area of one chain by one furlong (66 by 660 feet), which is exactly equal to 10 square chains,  of a square mile, 4,840 square yards, or 43,560 square feet, and approximately 4,047 m2, or about 40% of a hectare. Based upon the international yard and pound agreement of 1959, an acre may be declared as exactly 4,046.8564224 square metres. The acre is sometimes abbreviated ac but is usually spelled out as the word "acre".

Traditionally, in the Middle Ages, an acre was conceived of as the area of land that could be ploughed by one man using a team of 8 oxen in one day.

The acre is still a statutory measure in the United States. Both the international acre and the US survey acre are in use, but they differ by only four parts per million (see below). The most common use of the acre is to measure tracts of land.

The acre is commonly used in a number of current and former British Commonwealth countries by custom only. In a few, it continues as a statute measure, although since 2010 not in the UK itself, and not since decades ago in Australia, New Zealand and South Africa. In many of those where it is not a statute measure, it is still lawful to "use for trade" if given as supplementary information and is not used for land registration.

Description
While all modern variants of the acre contain 4,840 square yards, there are alternative definitions of a yard, so the exact size of an acre depends upon the particular yard on which it is based. Originally, an acre was understood as a selion of land sized at forty perches (660 ft, or 1 furlong) long and four perches (66 ft) wide; this may have also been understood as an approximation of the amount of land a yoke of oxen could plough in one day (a furlong being "a furrow long"). A square enclosing one acre is approximately 69.57 yards, or 208 feet 9 inches, on a side. As a unit of measure, an acre has no prescribed shape; any area of 43,560 square feet is an acre.

US survey acres
In the international yard and pound agreement of 1959, the United States and five countries of the Commonwealth of Nations defined the international yard to be exactly 0.9144 metre. The US authorities decided that, while the refined definition would apply nationally in all other respects, the US survey foot (and thus the survey acre) would continue 'until such a time as it becomes desirable and expedient to readjust [it]'. By inference, an "international acre" may be calculated as exactly  square metres but it does not have a basis in any international agreement.

Both the international acre and the US survey acre contain  of a square mile or 4,840 square yards, but alternative definitions of a yard are used (see survey foot and survey yard), so the exact size of an acre depends upon the yard upon which it is based. The US survey acre is about 4,046.872 square metres; its exact value ( m2) is based on an inch defined by 1 metre = 39.37 inches exactly, as established by the Mendenhall Order of 1893. Surveyors in the United States use both international and survey feet, and consequently, both varieties of acre.

Since the difference between the US survey acre and international acre (0.016 square metres, 160 square centimetres or 24.8 square inches), is only about a quarter of the size of an A4 sheet or US letter, it is usually not important which one is being discussed. Areas are seldom measured with sufficient accuracy for the different definitions to be detectable.

In October 2019, US National Geodetic Survey and National Institute of Standards and Technology announced their joint intent to end the "temporary" continuance of the US survey foot, mile and acre units (as permitted by their 1959 decision, above), with effect from the end of 2022.

Spanish acre
The Puerto Rican cuerda is sometimes called the "Spanish acre" in the continental United States.

Use 
The acre is commonly used in a number of current and former Commonwealth countries by custom, and in a few it continues as a statute measure. These include Antigua and Barbuda, American Samoa, The Bahamas, Belize, the British Virgin Islands, Canada, the Cayman Islands, Dominica, the Falkland Islands, Grenada, Ghana, Guam, the Northern Mariana Islands, Jamaica, Montserrat, Samoa, Saint Lucia, St. Helena, St. Kitts and Nevis, St. Vincent and the Grenadines, Turks and Caicos, the United Kingdom, the United States and the US Virgin Islands.

Republic of Ireland

In the Republic of Ireland, the hectare is legally used under European units of measurement directives; however, the acre is still widely used, especially in agriculture. (This is the standard statute acre, the same as used in the UK, not the old Irish acre which was of a different size.)

South Asia
In India, residential plots are measured in square feet, while agricultural land is measured in acres. In Sri Lanka, the division of an acre into 160 perches or 4 roods is common.

United Kingdom
Its use as a primary unit for trade in the United Kingdom ceased to be permitted from 1 October 1995, due to the 1994 amendment of the Weights and Measures Act, where it was replaced by the hectare  though its use as a supplementary unit continues to be permitted indefinitely. This was with exemption of Land registration, which records the sale and possession of land, in 2010 HM Land Registry ended its exemption. The measure is still used to communicate with the public, and informally (non-contract) by the farming and property industries.

Equivalence to other units of area

1 international acre is equal to the following metric units:
0.40468564224 hectare (A square with 100 m sides has an area of 1 hectare.)
4,046.8564224 square metres (or a square with approximately 63.61 m sides)

1 United States survey acre is equal to:
0.404687261 hectare
4,046.87261 square metres (1 square kilometre is equal to 247.105 acres)

1 acre (both variants) is equal to the following customary units:
66 feet × 660 feet (43,560 square feet)
10 square chains (1 chain = 66 feet = 22 yards = 4 rods = 100 links)
1 acre is approximately 208.71 feet × 208.71 feet (a square)
4,840 square yards
43,560 square feet
160 perches. A perch is equal to a square rod (1 square rod is 0.00625 acre)
4 roods
A furlong by a chain (furlong 220 yards, chain 22 yards)
40 rods by 4 rods, 160 rods2 (historically fencing was often sold in 40 rod lengths)
 (0.0015625) square mile (1 square mile is equal to 640 acres)

To be more exact, one acre is 90.75% of a 100-yd-long by 53.33-yd-wide American football field (without the end zone).

For residents of other countries, the acre might be envisioned as rather more than half of a  football pitch.

It may also be remembered as 1% short of 44,000 square feet.

Historical origin 

The word acre is derived from Old English  originally meaning "open field", cognate with west coast Norwegian , Icelandic , Swedish , German , Dutch , Latin , Sanskrit , and Greek . In English, an obsolete variant spelling was aker.

According to the Act on the Composition of Yards and Perches, dating from around 1300, an acre is "40 perches [rods] in length and four in breadth", meaning 220 yards by 22 yards. As detailed in the box on the right, an acre was roughly the amount of land tillable by a yoke of oxen in one day.

Before the enactment of the metric system, many countries in Europe used their own official acres. The Normandy  was usually divided in 4  (roods) and 160 square , like the English acre.

The Normandy  was equal to 1.6 , the unit of area more commonly used in Northern France outside of Normandy. In Canada, the Paris  used in Quebec before the metric system was adopted is sometimes called "French acre" in English, even though the Paris  and the Normandy  were two very different units of area in ancient France (the Paris  became the unit of area of French Canada, whereas the Normandy  was never used in French Canada).

Statutory values for the acre were enacted in England, and subsequently the United Kingdom, by acts of:
Edward I
Edward III
Henry VIII
George IV
Queen Victoria – the British Weights and Measures Act of 1878 defined it as containing 4,840 square yards.

Historically, the size of farms and landed estates in the United Kingdom was usually expressed in acres (or acres, roods, and perches), even if the number of acres was so large that it might conveniently have been expressed in square miles. For example, a certain landowner might have been said to own 32,000 acres of land, not 50 square miles of land.

The acre is related to the square mile, with 640 acres making up one square mile. One mile is 5280 feet (1760 yards). In western Canada and the western United States, divisions of land area were typically based on the square mile, and fractions thereof. If the square mile is divided into quarters, each quarter has a side length of  mile (880 yards) and is  square mile in area, or 160 acres. These subunits would typically then again be divided into quarters, with each side being  mile long, and being  of a square mile in area, or 40 acres. In the United States, farmland was typically divided as such, and the phrase "the back 40" would refer to the 40-acre parcel to the back of the farm. Most of the Canadian Prairie Provinces and the US Midwest are on square-mile grids for surveying purposes.

Legacy acres
 Customary acre – The customary acre was roughly similar to the Imperial acre, but it was subject to considerable local variation similar to the variation in carucates, virgates, bovates, nooks, and farundels. These may have been multiples of the customary acre, rather than the statute acre.
It is nearly 10% smaller than a survey acre, and the discrepancy has led to lawsuits alleging misrepresentation.
 Scottish acre = 1.3 Imperial acres (5,080 m2, an obsolete Scottish measurement)
 Irish acre = 
 Cheshire acre =  
 Stremma or Greek acre ≈ 10,000 square Greek feet, but now set at exactly 1,000 square metres (a similar unit was the zeugarion)
 Dunam or Turkish acre ≈ 1,600 square Turkish paces, but now set at exactly 1,000 square metres (a similar unit was the çift)
 Actus quadratus or Roman acre ≈ 14,400 square Roman feet (about 1,260 square metres)
 God's Acre – a synonym for a churchyard.
 Long acre  the grass strip on either side of a road that may be used for illicit grazing.
 Town acre was a term used in early 19th century in the planning of towns on a grid plan, such as Adelaide, South Australia and Wellington, New Plymouth and Nelson in New Zealand. The land was divided into plots of an Imperial acre, and these became known as town acres.

See also

 Acre-foot – used in US to measure a large water volume
 Anthropic units
 Conversion of units
 French arpent – used in Louisiana to measure length and area
 Jugerum
 a Morgen ("morning") of land is normally  of a Tagwerk ("day work") of ploughing with an ox
 Public Land Survey System
 Quarter acre
 Section (United States land surveying)
 Spanish customary units

Notes

References

External links

 The Units of Measurement Regulations 1995 (United Kingdom)

Customary units of measurement in the United States
Imperial units
Surveying
Units of area